Sauxillanges is a commune in the Puy-de-Dôme department in Auvergne in central France.

Twin towns
Sauxillanges is twinned with:

  Fosdinovo, Italy, since 2003

See also
Communes of the Puy-de-Dôme department

References

Communes of Puy-de-Dôme